The 1978 Major League Baseball postseason was the playoff tournament of Major League Baseball for the 1978 season. The winners of each division advance to the postseason and face each other in a League Championship Series to determine the pennant winners that face each other in the World Series.

This was the second of two consecutive postseasons to feature the same teams - the New York Yankees, Kansas City Royals, Philadelphia Phillies, and Los Angeles Dodgers. The former three teams would all return for the 1980 postseason, and all four would return in the expanded 1981 postseason.

The playoffs began on October 3, 1978, and concluded on October 17, 1978, with the Yankees again defeating the Dodgers in six games in the 1978 World Series. The Yankees repeated as World Series champions.

Playoff seeds
The following teams qualified for the postseason:

American League
 New York Yankees - 100–63, Clinched AL East (on tiebreaker)
 Kansas City Royals - 92–70, Clinched AL West

National League
 Philadelphia Phillies - 90–72, Clinched NL East
 Los Angeles Dodgers - 95–67, Clinched NL West

1978 AL East tie-breaker game

The New York Yankees and Boston Red Sox both finished the 1978 regular season with identical 99–63 records, which forced a tiebreaker game to be played to determine who would advance to the postseason. The Yankees narrowly won 5–4 thanks to a 3-run home run from Bucky Dent and a solo HR from Reggie Jackson.

While not an official postseason meeting in the Yankees-Red Sox rivalry, both teams would eventually meet in the postseason in the ALCS in 1999, 2003, and 2004, the ALDS in 2018, and the 2021 AL Wild Card Game, with the Yankees winning the former two series, and the Red Sox winning the latter three.

Playoff bracket

American League Championship Series

New York Yankees vs. Kansas City Royals

For the third year in a row, the Yankees and Royals met in the ALCS, and once again the Yankees came out on top, this time in four games, to return to the World Series for the third year in a row. In Kansas City, the Yankees blew out the Royals in Game 1, while in Game 2, the Royals responded with a blowout victory of their own to even the series. Game 3 was a slugfest that the Yankees narrowly won, thanks to a two-run home run from Thurman Munson in the bottom of the eighth. Game 4 was a pitchers' duel between Yankees' ace Ron Guidry and Royals' ace Dennis Leonard, which would be won by the former as the Yankees narrowly prevailed by one run to secure the pennant.

Both teams would meet once more in the 1980 ALCS, where the Royals finally broke through. The Yankees would win their next AL pennant in 1981 over the Oakland Athletics in a sweep.

National League Championship Series

Los Angeles Dodgers vs. Philadelphia Phillies

For the second consecutive year, the Dodgers and Phillies met in the NLCS. The Dodgers yet again prevailed in four games and advanced to the World Series for the second straight year.

The Dodgers stole a Game 1 slugfest on the road, 9–5. They then took Game 2 off a complete game shutout from ace Tommy John. When the series shifted to Los Angeles for Game 3, the Phillies jumped out to an early lead and did not relinquish it, as they won by a 9–4 score to avoid a sweep. However, the Dodgers ended up winning the pennant in Game 4 with a narrow victory in extra innings.

The two teams would meet in the NLCS again in 1983, 2008 and 2009, however all three would be won by the Phillies. The Phillies would return to the NLCS in 1980, where they defeated the Houston Astros in five games to return to the World Series and win their first ever championship. The Dodgers would win their next NL pennant in 1981 over the Montreal Expos in five games.

1978 World Series

New York Yankees (AL) vs. Los Angeles Dodgers (NL)

This was the tenth World Series meeting in the history of the Dodgers-Yankees rivalry. In a near identical outcome to last year's series, the Yankees overcame a two games to none series deficit to again defeat the Dodgers in six games, repeating as World Series champions.

In Los Angeles, the Dodgers blew out the Yankees in Game 1, and overcame a late Yankees' lead in Game 2 thanks to a three-run home run from Ron Cey. When the series shifted to the Bronx, the Yankees got on the board in Game 3 off a complete game performance from ace Ron Guidry. In Game 4, the Yankees evened the series in extra innings as Lou Piniella drove in Roy White with an RBI single in the bottom of the tenth. Jim Beattie unexpectedly pitched a complete game in Game 5 as the Yankees blew out the Dodgers by ten runs to take a 3–2 series lead headed back to Los Angeles. In Game 6, Catfish Hunter helped lead the Yankees to victory, as they repeated as World Series champions.

Game 6 of the 1978 World Series was the last for Yankees catcher Thurman Munson, who died in a plane crash on August 2, 1979, at Akron-Canton Airport in Ohio.

These historical rivals would meet each other once more in the 1981 World Series, and in that series the Dodgers would prevail. This was the last time the Yankees won the World Series until 1996, where they defeated the Atlanta Braves in six games to end an 18-year championship drought.

References

External links
 League Baseball Standings & Expanded Standings - 1978

 
Major League Baseball postseason